Menosoma cincta is a species of leafhopper in the family Cicadellidae, found in North, Central, and South America. The species is also referred to as Menosoma cinctum.

Subspecies
These three subspecies belong to the species Menosoma cincta:
 Menosoma cincta binaria Ball, 1931
 Menosoma cincta cincta
 Menosoma cincta mexicana DeLong, 1945

References

Further reading

External links

 

Bahitini
Insects described in 1898